Exercise Purple Storm was a series of United States Southern Command, or the US Army South, exercises in Panama in 1989 that aimed to both assert United States treaty rights and to conduct tactical rehearsals for Operation Just Cause. These exercises were carried out, according to the US military, to protect the integrity of the Torrijos-Carter Treaties of 1977. Purple Storm was part of the Prayer Book series of plans created as relations between Panama and the US deteriorated.

See also
Operation Sand Flea

References

Citations

Bibliography 
 

Military exercises involving the United States
Panama–United States relations
1989 in Panama